Mount Christi is a mountain rising to  in the northern Imeon Range on Smith Island in the South Shetland Islands, Antarctica. The peak overlooks Kongur Glacier to the west-northwest, Saparevo Glacier to the north and Ritya Glacier to the southeast.

The name "Cape Christi" was given for the north cape of Smith Island by a British expedition under Henry Foster, 1828–31, but that feature had already been named Cape Smith. Since the latter name is approved for the cape, the UK Antarctic Place-names Committee recommended in 1953 that for the sake of historical continuity the name "Christi" be approved for the mountain now described.

Location

Maps
Chart of South Shetland including Coronation Island, &c. from the exploration of the sloop Dove in the years 1821 and 1822 by George Powell Commander of the same. Scale ca. 1:200000. London: Laurie, 1822.
  L.L. Ivanov. Antarctica: Livingston Island and Greenwich, Robert, Snow and Smith Islands. Scale 1:120000 topographic map. Troyan: Manfred Wörner Foundation, 2010.  (First edition 2009. )
 South Shetland Islands: Smith and Low Islands. Scale 1:150000 topographic map No. 13677. British Antarctic Survey, 2009.
 Antarctic Digital Database (ADD). Scale 1:250000 topographic map of Antarctica. Scientific Committee on Antarctic Research (SCAR). Since 1993, regularly upgraded and updated.
 L.L. Ivanov. Antarctica: Livingston Island and Smith Island. Scale 1:100000 topographic map. Manfred Wörner Foundation, 2017.

References

 SCAR Composite Antarctic Gazetteer.

External links
 Mount Christi. Copernix satellite image

Mountains of Smith Island (South Shetland Islands)